This is a list of events from British radio in 1946.

Events

January
 3 January – American-born Nazi propagandist William Joyce is hanged at HM Prison Wandsworth in London for high treason for his English-language wartime broadcasts on German radio.
 20 January – Composer Granville Bantock writes to fellow composer Rutland Boughton criticising the BBC Music Department's attitude towards some newer composers.

February
No events.

March
 5 March – Have A Go with Wilfred Pickles and his wife, Mabel, is introduced; it is the first British quiz show to offer prizes (although these are limited to a few pounds and some home-made produce). Initially broadcast as Have a Go, Joe! on BBC Home Service North until August, from 16 September it is produced by BBC Manchester for national transmission on the Light Programme.
 24 March – BBC Home Service radio in the UK broadcasts Alistair Cooke's first American Letter. As Letter from America, this programme will continue until a few weeks before Cooke's death in 2004.

April
No events.

May
No events.

June
The BBC's regional director for Wales tells Welsh MPs that there is "not enough talent... to sustain a full continuous programme".

July
No events.

August
No events.

September
 29 September – The BBC Third Programme launches at 6pm. The evenings-only service is devoted to broadcasting classical music and programming about the arts.

October
 7 October – The BBC Light Programme transmits the first episode of the daily magazine programme Woman's Hour (initially presented by Alan Ivimey), which will still be running 75 years later.
 The BBC begins broadcasting a 2-month comedy series Heigh-Ho, its first script by Frank Muir, featuring Peter Waring, Kenneth Horne and Charmian Innes, and produced by Charles Maxwell; no further series is commissioned after Waring's criminal convictions come to light.

November
No events.

December
 31 December – BBC General Forces Programme closes down.

Unknown
 The BBC adopts the Paris Theatre, a former cinema in London's Regent Street, as a studio for recording comedy and other shows before a live audience.
 Bush DAC90 bakelite radio introduced in the UK: it becomes the best-selling model for some years.

Station debuts
 29 September – The BBC Third Programme

Closing this year
 31 December – BBC General Forces Programme

Debuts
 4 January – Housewives' Choice (1946–1967)
 5 March – Have A Go (1946–1967)
 24 March – Letter from America (1946–2004)
 7 October
 Dick Barton – Special Agent (1946–1951)
 Woman's Hour (1946–Present)
 29 December – Down Your Way (1946–1992)

Continuing radio programmes

1930s
 In Town Tonight (1933–1960)

1940s
 Music While You Work (1940–1967)
 Sunday Half Hour (1940–2018)
 Desert Island Discs (1942–Present)
 Family Favourites (1945–1980)

Births
 25 January – Pete Price, Merseyside media personality and radio presenter
 4 February – Peter Allen, radio broadcaster
 18 February – Michael Buerk, journalist and broadcast presenter
 22 March – Jonathan James-Moore, radio comedy producer (died 2005)
 11 April – Bob Harris, broadcast music presenter
 17 April – Henry Kelly, Irish-born broadcast presenter
 7 May – Michael Rosen, children's poet and radio presenter
 26 May – Simon Hoggart, journalist and broadcaster (died 2014)
 26 August – Alison Steadman, comic actress
 7 October – Jenny Abramsky, BBC Director of Audio and Music
 13 October – Edwina Currie, Conservative politician, author and radio personality
 31 December – Eric Robson, broadcast presenter
 Sue Limb, scriptwriter

Deaths
 3 January – William Joyce, 39, American-born propagandist
 16 October – Sir Granville Bantock, 78, composer

See also 
 1946 in British music
 1946 in British television
 1946 in the United Kingdom
 List of British films of 1946

References 

 
Years in British radio
Radio